The following are the oldest public high schools in the United States that are still in operation. While some of these schools have operated as private schools in the past, all are currently public schools. The list does not include schools that have closed or consolidated with another school to form a new institution. The list is ordered by date of creation, and currently includes schools formed before 1870.

 Boston Latin School (1635), Boston, Massachusetts
 Hartford Public High School (1638), Hartford, Connecticut
 Cambridge Rindge and Latin School (1648), Cambridge, Massachusetts
 Hopkins Academy (1664), Hadley, Massachusetts
 Glynn Academy (1788), Brunswick, Georgia
 Canandaigua Academy (1791), Canandaigua, New York
 Westford Academy (1792), Westford, Massachusetts
 Oxford Academy and Central Schools (1794), Oxford, New York
 Newburgh Free Academy (1796), Newburgh, New York
 Woodstock Academy (1801), Woodstock, Connecticut ("a quasi-private, independent school")
 Monmouth Academy (1803), Monmouth, Maine
 Bacon Academy (1803), Colchester, Connecticut
 Hampden Academy (1803), Hampden, Maine
 Pinkerton Academy (1814), Derry, New Hampshire (not strictly public, yet not private)
 Columbia High School (1814), Maplewood, New Jersey
 Cony High School (1815), Augusta, Maine
 Bel Air High School (1816), Bel Air, Maryland
 Pembroke Academy (1818), Pembroke, New Hampshire
 Delaware Academy (1819), Delhi, New York
 English High School of Boston (1821), Boston, Massachusetts
 Portland High School (1821), Portland, Maine
 Kentucky School for the Deaf (1823), Danville, Kentucky
 Prattsburgh Central School (1823), Prattsburgh, New York
 New Bedford High School (1827), New Bedford, Massachusetts
 Norcross High School (1827), Norcross, Georgia
 Keene High School (1828), Keene, New Hampshire
 Elyria High School (1830), Elyria, Ohio
 Lahainaluna High School (1831), Maui, Hawaii
 Leon High School (1831), Tallahassee, Florida
 Lowell High School (1831), Lowell, Massachusetts
 Newburyport High School (1831), Newburyport, Massachusetts
 Woodward High School (1831), Cincinnati, Ohio
 Cambridge High School (1834), Cambridge, Illinois
 Medford High School (1835), Medford, Massachusetts
 Bellevue High School (1836), Bellevue, Michigan
 Central High School (1836), Philadelphia, Pennsylvania
 Auburn High School (1837), Auburn, Alabama
 Windsor High School (1837), Windsor, New York
 Barringer High School (1838), Newark, New Jersey
 Cohasset High School (1838), Cohasset, Massachusetts
 Nantucket High School (1838), Nantucket, Massachusetts
 Taunton High School (1838), Taunton, Massachusetts
 Virginia School for the Deaf and Blind (1838), Staunton, Virginia
 Baltimore City College (1839), Baltimore, Maryland
 Gloucester High School (1839), Gloucester, Massachusetts
 Middletown High School (1840), Middletown, Connecticut
 Brighton High School (1841), Boston, Massachusetts
 Haverhill High School (1841), Haverhill, Massachusetts
 Warren Easton Charter High School, formerly known as Boys High School (1843), New Orleans, Louisiana
 Brookline High School (1843), Brookline, Massachusetts
 Classical High School (1843), Providence, Rhode Island
 Drury High School (1843), North Adams, Massachusetts
 Tennessee School for the Deaf (1844), Knoxville, Tennessee
 Western High School (1844), Baltimore, Maryland
 Charlestown High School (1845), Boston, Massachusetts
 Lyons High School (1845), Lyons, New York
 Mary D. Bradford High School (1845), Kenosha, Wisconsin
 New Braunfels High School (1845), New Braunfels, Texas
 Windsor High School (1845), Windsor, Vermont
 Chelsea High School (1846), Chelsea, Massachusetts
 Concord High School (1846), Concord, New Hampshire
 Georgia School for the Deaf (1846), Cave Spring, Georgia
 Manchester Central High School (1846), Manchester, New Hampshire
 Pine Tree High School (1847), Longview, Texas
 Biddeford High School (1848), Biddeford, Maine
 Lockport High School (1848), Lockport, New York
 Philadelphia High School for Girls (1848), Philadelphia, Pennsylvania
 B.M.C. Durfee High School (1849), Fall River, Massachusetts
 Charlotte High School (1849), Charlotte, Michigan
 Fitchburg High School (1849), Fitchburg, Massachusetts
 Lawrence High School (1849), Lawrence, Massachusetts
 Rockport High School (1849), Rockport, Massachusetts
 Waltham High School (1849), Waltham, Massachusetts
 Ypsilanti High School (1849), Ypsilanti, Michigan
 Somerville High School (1852), Somerville, Massachusetts 
 Central High School (Commonly called Central VPA High School) (1853), St. Louis, Missouri
 Pottsville Area High School (1853), Pottsville, Pennsylvania
 New Albany High School (1853), New Albany, Indiana
 Arundel High School (1854), Gambrills, Maryland
 Norwich Free Academy (1854), Norwich, Connecticut (a "quasi-private school," "privately governed, independent secondary school")
Weymouth High School (1854) 
Andover High School (1856), Andover, Massachusetts
 Louisville Male High School (1856), Louisville, Kentucky
 Lowell High School (1856), San Francisco, California
 Pioneer High School (1856), Ann Arbor, Michigan
 Peoria High School (1856), Peoria, Illinois
 Texas School for the Deaf (1856), Austin, Texas
 University High School (1857), Normal, Illinois
 Braintree High School (1858), Braintree, Massachusetts
 Ravenna High School (1858), Ravenna, Ohio
 Hillhouse High School (1859), New Haven, Connecticut
 San Jose High School (1863), San Jose, California
 Shortridge High School (1864), Indianapolis, Indiana
 Loyola High School (1865), Los Angeles, California
 Saint Paul Central High School (1866), Saint Paul, Minnesota
 Hastings Senior High School (1866), Hastings, Minnesota
 Parkersburg High School (1867), Parkersburg, West Virginia
 Round Rock High School (1867), Round Rock, Texas
 Greely High School (1868), Cumberland, ME
 Theodore Roosevelt High School (1868), Kent, Ohio
 Morristown High School (1869), Morristown, New Jersey
 Lincoln High School (1869), Portland, Oregon
 Hunter College High School (1869), New York, New York
 Elgin High School (1869); Elgin, Illinois
 Oakland High School, (1869) Oakland, California

See also
 List of oldest schools
 List of the oldest private schools in the United States

References

Oldest
United States
Public high schools
Lists of education-related superlatives
United States